Porta Borsari is an ancient Roman gate in Verona, northern Italy.

It dates to the 1st century AD, though it was most likely built over a pre-existing gate from the 1st century BC. An inscription dating from emperor Gallienus' reign reports another reconstruction in 265 AD. The Via Postumia (which here became the decumanus maximus) passed through the gate, which was the city's main entrance and was therefore richly decorated. It also originally had an inner court, now disappeared.

The gate's Roman name was Porta Iovia, as it was located near a small temple dedicated to Jupiter lustralis. In the Middle Ages it was called Porta di San Zeno, while the current name derives from the guard soldiers which were paid the dazio (Latin bursarii).

The façade, in local white limestone, has two arches flanked by semi-columns with Corinthian capitals which supports entablature and pediment. In the upper part is a two-floor wall with twelve arched windows, some of which are included in small niches with triangular pediment.

See also
Porta Leoni

Notes

Borsari
Ancient Roman buildings and structures in Italy
Roman sites of Veneto
Buildings and structures completed in the 1st century